Shakadang Trail or Mysterious Valley Trail is a trail in Taroko National Park, Xiulin Township, Hualien County, Taiwan.

History
The trail was closed on 23 September until 1 November 2019, except on 10–13 October 2019.

Geology
The trail spans over a length of 4.1 km. It follows along the Shakadang Stream.

See also
 List of roads in Taiwan

References

Hiking trails in Taiwan
Taroko National Park
Tourist attractions in Hualien County